Warren Chappell (1904, Richmond, Virginia – March 26, 1991, Charlottesville, Virginia)  was an American illustrator, book and type designer, and author.

Education
He was a graduate of the University of Richmond, and then studied at the Art Students League of New York, under Boardman Robinson, where he later taught. In 1931-2 he studied type design and punch-cutting under Rudolf Koch at the Design School Offenbach in Germany.  In 1935 he studied illustration at the Colorado Springs Fine Arts Center.
The University of Richmond awarded him an honorary D.F.A. in 1968.  In 1970 his work in the graphic arts was recognized by the Rochester Institute of Technology, with the presentation of their Goudy Award.

Career
After running his studio in New York City for several years, Chappell traveled to Germany just before World War II to work at Stempel on the typeface Trajanus. He returned to the United States at the onset of the war, having seen only initial proofs. He first saw the completed typeface in Swedish design magazines during the war. He later devoted himself to book design and illustration and was closely associated with the firm of Alfred A. Knopf for which he designed many books. He also did illustrations for Random House, Harper & Row, and Doubleday.  He was a typography consultant to both the Book of the Month Club and American Type Founders.  He was Artist-in-Residence at the University of Virginia in Charlottesville.

John Updike and Chappell worked together on books for children on music, including "The Magic Flute" (1962), "The Ring" (1964) and "Bottom's Dream" (1969).  His design for the E. P. Dutton re-issues of A. A. Milne's Winnie-the-Pooh books are considered to be particularly elegant.

Typefaces

 Koch Uncial (1932) in collaboration with Paul Koch
 Lydian Series (ATF)
 Lydian + Italic (1938)
 Lydian Bold + Italic (1938)
 Lydian Cursive (1940)
 Lydian Condensed + Italic (1946)
 Trajanus Antiqua (roman) + Trajanus Kursiv (italic) + Trajanus Halbfett (semi-bold) (1939, Stempel + Linotype (Frankfurt)), named for the same Roman emperor as Carol Twombly's Trajan but a very different design, being a Medieval. See Fr. Edward Catich's research for more on the origin of the monumental lettering style which was the inspiration for the typeface Trajan. The semi-bold weight however, was prepared by the foundry, Chappell having only made drawings (starting with a broad nibbed pen, then refining the contours using opaque white as if using an engraver) for the roman and italic designs. The Huxley House specimen book for it was featured in an AIGA design annual.

Bibliography
As Chappell was a prolific book designer and illustrator, a complete bibliography would be the subject of a specialized work. Following are books he wrote himself or for which he is especially well known.

 The Anatomy of Lettering (1934)
 A Short History of the Printed Word (1970; a revised edition was published in 2000)
 The Living Alphabet (on calligraphy, 1975)
 The Proverbial Bestiary with Rick Cusick (1982)

Illustrated children's books:
 A Tale of a Tub by Swift, (1930)
 The Nutcracker (1958)
 They Say Stories (1960)
 Sleeping Beauty (1961)
 Moby-Dick W. W. Norton & Co. (1967).

References
 MacGrew, Mac, "American Metal Typefaces of the Twentieth Century," Oak Knoll Books, New Castle Delaware, 1993, .
Friedl, Ott, and Stein, Typography: an Encyclopedic Survey of Type Design and Techniques Throughout History. Black Dog & Levinthal Publishers: 1998. .

External links
 Albert and Shirley Small Special Collections Library at University of Virginia holds Chappell's papers and a large collection of his books – as of June 2016, reports 651 hits for Author: Chappell, Warren, 1904–1991
 Warren Chappell papers, 1931–1978 at Columbia University Libraries Archival Collections
 Discussion about an unpublished font of Chappell's called Eichenauer 
 

1904 births
1991 deaths
American children's writers
American graphic designers
American illustrators
American typographers and type designers
Art Students League of New York alumni
Artists from Richmond, Virginia
University of Richmond alumni
20th-century American non-fiction writers